The 2022 GB4 Championship partnered by the BRDC was the first season of a new motor racing championship for open wheel, formula racing cars in Britain. The 2022 season was the inaugural season for the championship, which was organised by MotorSport Vision. The season ran over eight triple-header rounds and started on 2 April at Snetterton Circuit.

GB4 acts as a direct feeder series to higher open-wheel categories, including the existing GB3 Championship partnered by the BRDC. GB4 runs primarily on the same British GT race programme as GB3, and retains many of the same championship partners. Teams use the Tatuus F4-T014 chassis in the 2022 championship. The car is powered by a 1.4 litre turbocharged 160 HP engine by Autotecnica Motori.

GB4 offered its inaugural champion a £50,000 prize towards their next season of single-seater racing as part of the overall prize package. Other prizes included the George Russell Pole Position Cup with a prize fund of £4,000 and a £20,000 shoot out prize for teenage drivers in the BRSCC National Formula Ford Championship.

All 24 races in the debut season were shown live online.

Teams and drivers 
All teams are British-registered.

Calendar 
The provisional calendar was announced on 22 October 2021. The championship will support the British GT championship at seven of its eight meetings.

Championship standings 

 Scoring system

Points were awarded to the top 20 classified finishers in races one and two, with the third race awarding points to only the top 15. Race three, which had its grid formed by reversing the qualifying order, awarded extra points for positions gained from the drivers' respective starting positions.

 Notes

 1 2 3 refers to positions gained and thus extra points earned during race three.

Drivers' championship

Notes

References

External links 
 Official website

GB4 Championship seasons
GB4
GB4
GB4